"Sei gesegnet ohne Ende" (English translation: Be Blessed Without End), also known as the ″Kernstock-Hymne″, is a German language song that was the national anthem of Austria from 1929 until 1938. Written by Ottokar Kernstock, it was sung to the famous tune of "Gott erhalte Franz den Kaiser" by Joseph Haydn, better known as the tune of the "Deutschlandlied", which since 1922 has been the national anthem of Germany.

History 
The first but unofficial anthem of the First Austrian Republic was Deutschösterreich, du herrliches Land ("German-Austria, you Glorious Land"). Written in 1920 by Karl Renner and set to music by Wilhelm Kienzl, the patriotic song was not able to successfully compete against the former imperial anthem and especially the latter's famous tune by Joseph Haydn.

In 1929, a new anthem was introduced that was sung to this popular tune and whose text stemmed from Ottokar Kernstock, who had written it in 1920. The third verse of the poem was, however, excluded from the official status as national anthem. The song remained in use in both the First Republic and the Federal State of Austria but became obsolete in 1938, when Austria joined the German Reich.

It was not the only proposal for a new Austrian national anthem. Anton Wildgans asked Richard Strauss to set one of his poems, Österreichisches Lied ("Austrian Song"), to music. Although Strauss did so, the music to the poem did not become popular. Here are excerpts of the poem:

The introduction of the Kernstockhymne actually led to chaos, as everyone sang different lyrics to the same tune, depending on their political standpoints. The school council of Vienna decreed that people should sing Deutschland über alles, the Ministry of Education demanded for everyone to sing the Kernstockhymne. Consequently, people sang the anthem that fitted their personal political views: the former imperial anthem, the Kernstockhymne, or the Deutschlandlied, which often led to dissonance when the national anthem was sung publicly.

Since 1936, it had become customary to also sing the Lied der Jugend as part of the national anthem, thus honouring the murdered chancellor Engelbert Dollfuß.

As the Kernstockhymne had never gained popularity, no attempt was made to reinstate it as the national anthem after World War II.

See also 
 List of historical national anthems
 Land der Berge, Land am Strome
 Dem Vaterland
 Deutschlandlied
 Deutschösterreich, du herrliches Land

References

External links 
 Audio sample
 Peter Diem: Die Symbole Österreichs (in German)

Historical national anthems
German patriotic songs
National symbols of Austria
European anthems
National anthem compositions in E-flat major